The 2017–18 Ukrainian Premier League season is the 27th top level football club competitions since the fall of the Soviet Union and the tenth since the establishment of the Ukrainian Premier League.

The tournament started on 16 July 2017 with the competition set to end on 19 May 2018. The relegation play-offs took place on 23 May and 26 May 2018. The league has scheduled to take its winter intermission after Round 19 on 9–10 December 2017 and resume its competition of the Championship with Round 20 on 17 February 2018.

The defending champion is the 10-times winner FC Shakhtar Donetsk.

The league's last season title sponsor, a bookmaker company Parimatch, withdrew from the sponsorship. On 7 July 2017, Pari-Match announced that it had ended its cooperation with the Ukrainian Premier League.

Before the start of the season a scandal arose around promotion between the First League clubs FC Desna Chernihiv and NK Veres Rivne when Veres that placed lower in tournament table was admitted to the Premier League ahead of Desna. Later it was announced that Desna might be promoted as well due to rumors around a financial situation of FC Stal Kamianske. The final decision of the league's composition was adopted at the FFU Conference on 16 June 2017.

With the ongoing War in Donbass, the Round 2 games started with a minute of silence to commemorate the warriors of the Armed Forces of Ukraine who had perished in the ATO zone.

Competition format 
On 28 April 2017, the Ukrainian Premier League administration announced that its General Assembly of participants adopted decision about changes to the competition format and calendar for the next 2017–18 season. Before the assembly, the UPL Administration presented to its clubs five variants of competition format.

 For the next season UPL will keep 12 clubs (that fact was confirmed at the conference of coaches few days prior);
 Competition will have two stages, with the first stage having 22 rounds and the second stage after team will split into two six-members groups having 10 more rounds in each group;
 Team that placed the 12th will be relegated directly to Persha Liha, teams that placed 10th and 11th will play two-leg play-off with the second and third teams of the Persha Liha.

The format was confirmed by the FFU Executive Committee on 30 May 2017.

The draw for the second stage calendar was announced on 10 February and is scheduled to take place three days later on 13 February 2018.

Next season changes and a structural reform
On 26 October 2017, the magazine "Futbol" reported quoting the FFU Executive Committee member Artem Frankov that the Ukrainian Premier League at its next earliest session will review a possibility to expand the league back to 16 teams starting since the 2019–20 season. At the same time number of clubs in the Ukrainian First League will be decreased also to 16 teams.

On 8 November 2017, a conference took place involving officials of the Ukrainian Premier League as well as the Football Federation of Ukraine (FFU) where its participants were discussing a reorganization of competition system in professional and amateur football. A decision about the reform was adopted by the FFU Executive Committee on 20 June 2017.

Teams

Promotions 
Two teams were promoted to the league (instead of the relegated FC Dnipro and FC Volyn Lutsk):
 FC Mariupol (renamed after the previous season) – the champion of the 2016–17 Ukrainian First League  (returning after two seasons absence)
 NK Veres Rivne – third place of the 2016–17 Ukrainian First League (returning for the first time since 1994–95, 22 seasons absence)

Location map 
The following displays the location of teams.

Stadiums 
Five teams play their matches outside of home towns. The minimum threshold for the stadium's capacity in the UPL is 5,000.

The following stadiums are regarded as home grounds:

Notes:

Personnel and sponsorship 

Notes:
 Ever since Darijo Srna was tested positive for doping (dehydroepiandrosterone among others), on 22 September 2017 he voluntarily stopped participation in competitions and on 20 November 2017 he has been suspended by UEFA for the continental competitions. The team's captain for Shakhtar has been served either by Taras Stepanenko or Taison. On 22 February 2018, the disqualification was officially applied and retrospectively including the time he was suspended from competitions. The start time of disqualification was identified as 22 March 2017 (date of test taken) and the end time shall be no earlier than 22 August 2018.

Managerial changes 

Notes:

First stage

First stage table

First stage results

First stage positions by round 
The following table represents the teams position after each round in the competition played chronologically.

Championship round

Championship round table

Championship round results

Championship round positions by round

Relegation round

Relegation round table

Relegation round results

Relegation round positions by round

Relegation play-offs 
Teams that placed 10th and 11th in the 2017–18 Ukrainian Premier League play two-leg play-off with the second and third teams of the 2017–18 Ukrainian First League. On 11 May 2018, a draw for relegation play-offs took place in the House of Football, Kyiv. The games were played on 23 May and 27 May 2018.<ref>Levchenko, S. Referee appointments to the playoff matches for the right to play in Premier-Liha (Судейские назначения на матчи плей-офф за право играть в Премьер-лиге). Footboom. 21 May 2018</ref>

First leg

Second legFC Poltava won 3–1 on aggregate and was promoted to the 2018–19 Ukrainian Premier League. Chornomorets Odesa was relegated to the 2018–19 Ukrainian First League. But later, the league picked Chornomorets Odesa for the FC Poltava's replacement for the next season after their withdrawal.Desna Chernihiv won 5–1 on aggregate and was promoted to the 2018–19 Ukrainian Premier League. Zirka Kropyvnytskyi was relegated to the 2018–19 Ukrainian First League. Season statistics 

 Top goalscorers 

 Hat-tricks 

(number) Player scored (number) goals if more than 3

 Awards 
 Monthly awards 

 Round awards 

The 2017 Coach of the Year award
The best coaches were identified by the All-Ukrainian Football Coaches Association.

Season awards
The laureates of the 2017–18 UPL season were:
 Best player:  Marlos (Shakhtar Donetsk)
 Best coach:  Alyaksandr Khatskevich (Dynamo Kyiv)
 Best goalkeeper:  Andriy Pyatov (Shakhtar Donetsk)
 Best arbiter:  Yuriy Mozharovskyi (Lviv)
 Best young player:  Viktor Tsyhankov (Dynamo Kyiv)
 Best goalscorer:  Facundo Ferreyra (Shakhtar Donetsk)

 Season's incidents 
 Desna vs Veres promotion 
On 1 June 2017, it was announced that second-placed club FC Desna Chernihiv was denied a license to play in the top division. The argument was that the club was not able to provide guarantees for an adequate financing of infrastructure. The license was received by NK Veres Rivne, the third-placed team during the last season in the second-tier division.

Both clubs FC Desna Chernihiv and NK Veres Rivne did not play at their home stadiums in the 2016–17 Ukrainian First League. The first one played in Kyiv at the Obolon Arena, while the other one played in Varash, at the Izotop Stadium of the Rivne Nuclear Power Plant. The administration of Desna released a letter of protest before a meeting of FFU representatives. In protest, the Desna administration announced that the club would not play its final game of the season against FC Illichivets Mariupol, but later relented. Nonetheless, during the game, players of both teams expressed their protest on the field in a special way: when the whistle was blown the players, instead of starting play, were demonstratively standing around yet kicking a ball.

On 2 June 2017, upon conclusion of its conference the UPL administration announced about the final composition of the league and calendar for the upcoming season. The conference confirmed the admission of Veres to the league and the only club that voted against was FC Dynamo Kyiv, while six votes were for decision and three (including FC Zorya Luhansk) abstained. On 2 June 2017, the Desna fans were picketing the House of Football in Kyiv after they arrived on four buses from Chernihiv.

On 7 June 2017, sports media UA-Football requested from Football Federation of Ukraine and FC Desna Chernihiv to publish related documents to have better understanding over the situation and come to some kind of closure on the subject.

Number of football experts negatively commented on the situation,The lawlessness should not be in place, this a sport and we play for spectators (Khatskevych: (Хацкевич: Беcпредел не должен твориться, это спорт - мы играем для зрителей). UA-Football. 7 June 2017Haponenko, O. Veres won over Desna in the final of the Cabinet's Football Cup (Верес обыграл Десну в финале Кубка Кабинетного футбола). Football 24. 2 June 2017 while the PFC Sumy head coach Anatoliy Bezsmertnyi stated that tomorrow these sports functionaries in such way will make Veres the national champions. The former PFL president Svyatoslav Syrota said that the FFU vice-president is lying about Desna problems. President of FC Inhulets Petrove, Oleksandr Porovoznyuk, called on other clubs to withdraw their teams from the league in support for FC Desna Chernihiv. President of FC Hirnyk-Sport Horishni Plavni Petro Kaplun stated that it makes him laugh when the president of Veres Oleksiy Khakhlev asks to follow the regulations. He points out that last season Veres was admitted to the Second League with complete disregard to the season's regulations. Kaplun also called on the FFU authorities to pay attention to what owners of professional clubs have to say as they have a right to express their vote of confidence for the FFU leadership.

 Mariupol vs Dynamo (security issues) 
Another issue relating to the Russian military intervention in Ukraine became serious when FC Dynamo Kyiv failed to arrive to Mariupol for the away game against FC Mariupol on 27 August 2017.

The issue was ongoing ever since the end of previous season when on 2 June 2017 FC Mariupol's promotion to the Ukrainian Premier League became official. The vice president also offered to conduct the game on a neutral field such as Dnipro Arena. Few days later in more details the same announcement was repeated by Ihor Surkis who also added that if he will receive documented security guarantees, he will send his team to Mariupol.Surkis: Give me the iron-strong guarantees and we will play even in Donetsk (Суркис: Дайте железные гарантии - и мы сыграем хоть в Донецке). UA-Football. 7 June 2017

The leadership of the Football Federation of Ukraine (FFU) in a face of Andriy Pavelko right away expressed its opposition for the Dynamo's statement. The president of FFU made an emphasis that the game in Mariupol is an important component of uniting policy on national scale. He also underlined that there is no danger in conducting the game in Mariupol.

During preparation for the next season the issue was moved to background. However, when the season started on 16 July 2017, the issue surfaced again. About a week later, on 24 July 2017, Dynamo received recommendation letter from the Ministry of Interior and the Security Service of Ukraine where it was urged not to travel to Mariupol for a game. The same day Dynamo published its own letter addressed to the Football Federation of Ukraine and Ukrainian Premier League petitioning to transfer the Round 7 game against Mariupol scheduled on 27 August 2017 to another city. Two days later, on 26 July 2017, almost at the same time both the Minister of Interior (Arsen Avakov) and the President of UPL (Volodymyr Heninson) made public announcements assuring in safety of conducting football games in the littoral city of the Sea of Azov.

Throughout the rest of month of July two games took place in Mariupol. Until August FC Karpaty Lviv supported the position of Dynamo. Eventually to this "stand off" became involved the general manager of FC Shakhtar Donetsk Serhiy Palkin, while the television channel "Football" launched a wide informational campaign in support to conduct the game. For example, during one of the channel's broadcasting the president of Football Federation of Mariupol city called Hryhoriy Surkis the "main football separatist" and offered him to resolve the issue through Viktor Medvedchuk and the president of the aggressor state (Vladimir Putin).President of the Football Federation of Mariupol: For me the main football separatist is Hryhoriy Surkis (Глава Федерации футбола Мариуполя: Главный футбольный сепаратист для меня - Григорий Суркис). UA-Football. 14 August 2017President of Football Federation of Mariupol Zhuravlyov: Surkis often goes to Moscow. Perhaps he receives a request from the aggressor (Голова федерації футболу Маріуполя Журавльов: Суркіс часто їздить в Москву. Може, там він отримує прохання від агресора). Football 24. 13 August 2017 On 11 August 2017, the Deputy director of National Police in Donetsk Oblast wrote an official letter to the Football Federation of Ukraine with security guarantees for all games in Mariupol. Finally the game between FC Mariupol and FC Karpaty took place on August 13 in Mariupol.

On 18 August 2017, FFU issued a press release where it denied the petition of Dynamo in transferring the game. The session of the FFU Executive Committee that had taken place on 22 August 2017 should have solved the problem.

Following no show of Dynamo to the game with FC Mariupol on 27 August 2017, FC Mariupol issued a press release where it accused its opponents in attempt to discredit the football club from Mariupol. On 14 November 2017, The Appeal Committee of the Football Federation of Ukraine did not satisfy the Dynamo appeal and counted the team's technical defeat.

On 19 February 2018, the Court of Arbitration for Sport in Lausanne declined all claims of Dynamo to the Football Federation of Ukraine in relations to the "Mariupol case".Committee decision. Media release Court of Arbitration for Sport. Retrieved 14 February 2023

On 28 February 2018, the Ukrainian Premier League has officially updated its standings in correspondence to the earlier decision of the FFU CDC of 11 September 2017.

Relocation of teams
Due to the 2014 Russian invasion of Ukraine some football clubs were forced to be dissolved, other moved away to other cities in Ukraine. Among the UPL teams, teams from Donetsk, Olimpik and Shakhtar, moved to Kyiv, Zorya Luhansk moved to Zaporizhia, teams from the Autonomous Republic of Crimea, Tavriya and Sevastopol, were dissolved. The relocated teams did not hurry with their change of place of registry in hope to be able to return home in near future.

In 2018 Shakhtar has officially changed its place of registry from Donetsk to Mariupol.

During the season several clubs (Shakhtar, Stal, and Veres) changed their city registration for various reasons and informed the Football Federation of Ukraine that since the next season will represent other cities.

2018 UPL presidential elections
The 2018 presidential elections of the Ukrainian Premier League took place on 6 April 2018. The current president Volodymyr Heninson that serves as the president since February 2016 announced that he will not run for president in 2018.Heninson confirmed that he won't run for the UPL president (Генінсон підтвердив, що не йде на вибори президента УПЛ). Football 24. 7 March 2018 Among possible candidates specialists note a Swiss lawyer Thomas Grimm or Joe Palmer from AFC Wimbledon. As of 26 March 2018, a day before deadline for submitting candidacy for election, there is only Thomas Grimm whose candidacy was submitted by FC Oleksandriya on 22 March 2018. On 6 April 2018, Thomas Grimm was elected as a new president with 10 votes for and 2 abstained.Boiko, I.Returning of spectators to stands and with what else the new UPL president is getting ready to be preoccupied (Повернення глядачів на трибуни та чим ще має зайнятись новий президент УПЛ). Sport Arena. 6 April 2018

Prospective disciplinary sanctions
According to FootballHub, in March the FFU Disciplinary Committee prosecuted the Olimpik's junior teams U-19 and U-21 for game fixing. Earlier the CDC chairman, Francesco Baranca, underlined that Olimpik won't participate in European competitions if its junior teams will be disqualified.

FC Vorskla Poltava could have problems with the league's attestation for next season for debts to its former players. Another UPL player submitted his claim to the FFU CDC against its former club FC Stal Kamianske.

 See also 
 2017–18 Ukrainian First League
 2017–18 Ukrainian Second League
 2017–18 Ukrainian Cup
 List of Ukrainian football transfers summer 2017
 List of Ukrainian football transfers winter 2017–18

 Notes 

 References 

 External links 
 Official website of the Ukrainian Premier League
 Mariupol – Dynamo: discussion around the game that failed to take place only begins (Маріуполь - Динамо: дискусія довкола матчу, що не відбувся, тільки починається). PROFUTBOL (ПРОФУТБОЛ). 27 August 2017. (YouTube video, Ukrainian/Russian)
 Nazarkevych, Yu. The Rivne's record (Рівненський рекорд)''. Ukrainian Premier League. 19 November 2017

Ukrainian Premier League seasons
1
Ukr